South Great George's Street is a street in south-central Dublin, Ireland.

History

Early history and naming
The area is associated with Early Scandinavian Dublin.  Four burials excavated near South Great George's Street were also associated with domestic habitations, suggesting that the deceased had been members of a settled Norse community, and not the fatalities suffered by a transient raiding party.

The street was originally called St George's Lane and takes its name from a church dedicated to Saint George, patron of England and lepers, which stood here in 1181. The church was rebuilt in 1213 and stood until demolition in 1586. By 1766 it is being called St George's Street, but in 1773 the northern end still referred to as Lane.

It is thought that South Great George's Street follows the course of an early medieval route – or possibly even the eastern boundary of a longphort, assuming that there was a naval encampment along the eastern shore of the Black Pool (Dubh Linn) of Dublin at some stage in the settlement's early history.

18th to 19th centuries
The acrobat Madame Violante opened a theatre on George's Lane in 1731. The building subsequently became the Dublin Lying-In Hospital in 1745, which was the first maternity hospital in the British Isles. Later, relocated, it became the Rotunda Hospital. The earlier premises subsequently became a hospital for treating venereal diseases until 1769; the treatment subsequently moved to the Westmoreland Lock Hospital.

The Castle Market was held here in the 18th century. In 1765, George's Lane hosted the first exhibition by the Society of Dublin Artists.

In the 1780s, the street was rebuilt by the Wide Streets Commission and renamed South Great George's Street (the name distinguishes it from North Great George's Street, located on the Northside).

Pim Brothers & Co. drapery store and warehouse opened on a building at the lower end of the street around 1843. It was refurbished ten years later by Sandham Symes. The premises closed in 1970 and is now a government office.

During Queen Victoria's 1849 visit, shortly after the Great Famine, a pharmacist on South Great George's Street flew a black flag with a crownless harp and black banners with the words "Famine" and "Pestilence"; these were removed by the Dublin Metropolitan Police.

The South City Markets (today George's Street Arcade) opened in 1881, and were designed by Lockwood and Mawson. One of the central landmarks the building is an ornate red brick and terracotta structure which originally housed a glass-covered marketplace. The market was gutted after a serious fire in 1892, and was replaced with intersecting arcades in a cruciform plan designed by William Henry Byrne. This interior has since be remodelled, but some original elements are still visible. Bewley's café opened in 1894 and remained on the street until 1999.

20th to 21st centuries
Like many parts of Dublin in the 1960s and 1970s, parts of the street were redeveloped as office space. Known as "the two ugly sisters", Castle House and Wicklow House were built on the western side of the street. They were built on the site of the former Pim's department store using pre-cast concrete with aluminium-fronted retail spaces on the ground floor. They were designed by the London architecture firm Arthur Swift and Partners.

In the 20th century, the street became popular with homosexuals, despite homosexuality being illegal until 1993.  The George, Dublin's premier gay bar, opened in 1985 and has become a centre of the LGBT community. The Dragon, a rival, opened in 2006.

Cultural depictions
South Great George's Street appears several times in the work of James Joyce:

Annie Sparrow's shop was located at 16 South Great George's Street.

See also

List of streets and squares in Dublin

References
Citations

Sources

 
 

Streets in Dublin (city)
Gay villages in Ireland